Hung Hom Bay was a bay in Victoria Harbour, between Tsim Sha Tsui and Hung Hom in the southeast of Kowloon Peninsula, Hong Kong.

Since 1994, parts of the bay were reclaimed, and by 2019 it had been completely extinguished. All of present-day Tsim Sha Tsui East and Hung Hom station on the MTR as well as the Hung Hom Ferry Pier are on land reclaimed from the bay. The reclamation also buried several rocks, including Rumsey Rock. The bay once came inland as far as the present-day interchange of the West Kowloon Corridor and the Hung Hom Bypass.

Education

 Hong Kong Community College (Hung Hom Bay campus)
 Hong Kong Polytechnic University
Ma Tau Chung Government Primary School（Hung Hom Bay） (馬頭涌官立小學（紅磡灣）)

Transportation

 Hung Hom station
 Hung Hom Ferry Pier

Facilities

Fortune Metropolis
Hong Kong Coliseum
Hung Hom Promenade

Hotel

Harbour Grand Kowloon
Harbour Plaza Metropolis
 Kerry Hotel Hong Kong

Residential

 Harbour Place 
 Harbourfront Horizon
 Harbourview Horizon
 The Harbourfront Landmark
 The Metropolis Residence
 Royal Peninsula
Stars by the Harbour

References

External links

Bays of Hong Kong
Tsim Sha Tsui East
Hung Hom
Victoria Harbour
Restricted areas of Hong Kong red public minibus